Deha may refer to:

Deha, a caste found in India
Deha Bozkan, a Turkish volleyball player

See also
DEHA (disambiguation)